The 1935–36 season was the 61st season of competitive football in England. Sunderland won the league, and in doing so they remain the last team to win the English League while wearing striped jerseys. They also equalled the record of six titles won by Aston Villa. It remains the most recent season that Sunderland would win the title.

Aston Villa and Blackburn Rovers were relegated from the First Division and therefore became the last two founder members of the Football League to lose top flight status for the first time.

Diary of the season
 16 November 1935: Table-toppers Sunderland beat Brentford 5–1, while George Camsell is among the goalscorers for Middlesbrough as they thrash Blackburn Rovers 6–1.

 27 February 1936: The weekend fixture list is not announced until Thursday evening (for games involving teams a long distance apart) and Friday evening for all others in an attempt to thwart the football pools companies' ability to print their coupons as part of the Pools War.

 9 March 1936: The Pools War ends and the League starts publishing the fixtures earlier in advance again.

Honours

Notes = Number in parentheses is the times that club has won that honour. * indicates new record for competition

Football League

First Division

Second Division

Third Division North

Third Division South

Top goalscorers

First Division
W. G. Richardson (West Bromwich Albion) – 39 goals

Second Division
Bobby Finan (Blackpool) – 34 goals

Third Division North
Robert Bell (Tranmere Rovers) – 33 goals

Third Division South
Albert Dawes (Crystal Palace) – 38 goals

References